Local elections held in Iligan City on May 13, 2013 within the Philippine general election. The resident voters elected for the elective local posts in the city: the mayor, vice mayor, the one congressman, and twelve councilors. Each official is elected publicly to a 3-year term and can be re-elected up to 3 terms in succession.

At the last of voter's registration last October 2012, the city has accumulated a total of 138,744 registered voters. Registered voters of the city no longer vote for provincial candidates such as the Governor and Vice Governor unlike its nearby towns. In 2010, through Republic Act 9724, Iligan City separated from the First District of Lanao del Norte.

Lawrence Lluch Cruz is the incumbent on his third consecutive term. Thus, he is prohibited to run due to term limits. Instead, Cruz's tandem and incumbent vice-mayor Henry Dy was challenged by the two other popular candidates, retired Colonel Celso Regencia and former mayor Franklin Quijano .

On May 14, 2013, Celso Regencia and Ruderic Marzo were proclaimed newly elected city mayor and vice-mayor of the city by the Board of Canvassers.

Results for Lone District Representative

Vicente "Varf" Belmonte, Jr. is the incumbent.

Results for Mayor

Results for Vice-Mayor

Results for City Councilors

 
 
 
 
 
 
 

 
 

 
|colspan=5 bgcolor=black|

References

External links
COMELEC - Official website of the Philippine Commission on Elections (COMELEC)
NAMFREL - Official website of National Movement for Free Elections (NAMFREL)
PPCRV - Official website of the Parish Pastoral Council for Responsible Voting (PPCRV)

Elections in Lanao del Norte
2013 Philippine local elections
Politics of Iligan